Dorcadion politum is a species of beetle in the family Cerambycidae. It was described by Dalman in 1823.

Subspecies
 Dorcadion politum akmolense Suvorov, 1911
 Dorcadion politum politum Dalman, 1823
 Dorcadion politum shapovalovi Danilevsky, 2006

See also 
Dorcadion

References

politum
Beetles described in 1823